J&T Express is a Philippine 3x3 basketball team which competes in the PBA 3x3, organized by the Philippines' top-flight professional league, Philippine Basketball Association.

History
J&T Express entered the PBA 3x3 in 2022 as a guest team. It is owned by logistics firm J&T Express, a longtime sponsor of the main PBA league. It unveiled its first ever team on September 6, 2022 with Ryan Monteclaro as playing coach.

Current roster

References

PBA 3x3 teams
2022 establishments in the Philippines
Basketball teams established in 2022